Forge is a village in the county of Powys, Wales near to Machynlleth. It lies on the southern Afon Dulas on the mountain road to Dylife and Llanidloes.

External links 
Photos of Forge, Powys and surrounding area on geograph

Villages in Powys